Vionnaz railway station is a railway station in the municipality of Collombey-Muraz, in the Swiss canton of Valais. It is an intermediate stop on the Saint-Gingolph–Saint-Maurice line and is served by local trains only. The station serves the municipality of Vionnaz, located on the opposite side of the Canal du Bras Neuf.

Services 
The following services stop at Vionnaz:

References

External links 
 
 
 

Railway stations in the canton of Valais
Swiss Federal Railways stations